The Ecumenical Catholic Church (ECC/ICE) is an independent Catholic church established in Santa Ana, California by Mark Steven Shirilau and Jeffrey Michael Lau, in 1987. Adhering to conventional Latin Catholic Trinitarian theology and professing the Nicene Creed, the Ecumenical Catholic Church practices a liturgy similar to the Pauline Mass. Also considered an offshoot of the Brazilian Catholic Apostolic Church, the ECC differentiates from Roman Catholicism and independent Brazilian Catholicism through affirming and ordaining persons within the LGBT community.

History

The Ecumenical Catholic Church was founded in Santa Ana, California, in 1987 by Mark Steven Shirilau (a former member of the Evangelical Lutheran Church in America and the Metropolitan Community Church) and Jeffrey Michael Lau (a former member of the Episcopal Church and the Metropolitan Community Church); the first edition of its canon law was completed and ratified on January 11, 1987. 

Shirilau was ordained a priest for the Ecumenical Catholic Church at the chapel of the Claremont School of Theology on the December 27,  1987, by an independent Catholic bishop.

The first public service (at St. John Ecumenical Catholic Church) was held on September 4, 1988, at the home chapel of Mark Shirilau and Jeffery Shirilau in Santa Ana. Robert Oscar Simpson became the first person baptized in the Ecumenical Catholic Church on July 10, 1989, at his house in Los Angeles. Simpson died of AIDS a few days later.

Mark Shirilau was consecrated into the episcopacy by Bishop Donald Lawrence Jolly of the Independent Catholic Church International in San Bernardino, CA, on May 19, 1991. At the service, Jeffery Shirilau—a non-ordained deacon of the Metropolitan Community Church—was ordained to the diaconate by Bishop Jolly. Bruce David LeBlanc—a community college professor—became the first priest ordained by Bishop Shirilau.

As of 2011, the Ecumenical Catholic Church expanded with missions and churches throughout Mexico, Latin America, and Italy.

Following the death of Bishop Shirilau from complications with pneumonia on January 12, 2014 while traveling in Sicily, Bishop David John Kalke of Mexico was elected as new primate archbishop of the Ecumenical Catholic Church. Some parishes within the United States and Italy did not accept Kalke's leadership and submitted themselves to the similarly-named jurisdiction of Archbishop Karl Rodig in the Ecumenical Catholic Church of Christ (founded in Florida during 1998).

References

External links 
Official website (Spanish)

Independent Catholic denominations
Christian organizations established in 1987
1987 establishments in California